Athletes from Germany (GER) have appeared in 27 of the 30 Summer Olympic Games, having competed in all Games except those of 1920, 1924 and 1948, when they were not permitted to do so. Germany has hosted the Summer Olympic Games twice; the 1936 Games in Berlin, and the 1972 Games in Munich.

The nation appeared 15 times as a single country (IOC code GER), before World War II and again after German reunification in 1990. Three times, from 1956 to 1964, German athletes from the separate states in West and East competed as a United Team of Germany, which is currently listed by the IOC as EUA, not GER.

Due to partition under occupation that resulted in three (until 1957) post-war German states, two concurrent Olympic teams with German athletes appeared on five occasions, in 1952, from 1968 to 1976, and in 1988. The all-time results of German athletes are thus divided among the designations GER, EUA, FRG, GDR and SAA (the Saarland, which only took part in the 1952 Summer Games and won no medals).

Including the Summer Games of 2020, German athletes have won 1384 medals : 438 gold, 456 silver and 490 bronze. The IOC currently splits these results among four codes, even though only the German Democratic Republic (East Germany; GDR) from 1968 to 1988 had sent a separate team to compete against the team of the German NOC that represented Germany (GER) since 1896.

Timeline of Germany at the Summer Olympics

1896–1912 

Germany entered all Olympic Games starting in 1896, even though the relations between the German Empire under Kaiser Wilhelm II, and the French Third Republic where Pierre de Coubertin revived Olympic games and held the 1900 Summer Olympics, were strained following the Franco-Prussian War of 1870–71. The country's overall medal ranks varied from second through seventh.

The worst result, seventh, occurred in the 1900 Paris Olympics. The German gymnasts were judged no better than 53rd in the single gymnastic contest organized by the French, behind dozens of Frenchmen, who occupied the first 18 places and thus won all three medals. In contrast, the Gymnastics at the 1896 Summer Olympics in Athens had seen eight contests, with Germans scoring five gold, three silver and two bronze medals.

The anticipated 1916 Summer Olympics, which were to be officially known as the Games of the VI Olympiad, were to have been held in Germany's capital, Berlin. At the outbreak of World War I in 1914, organization continued, as no one foresaw the war dragging on for four years. Eventually, though, the games were canceled.

1920–1948 

After World War I, the German Empire became a republic informally known as Weimar Republic, a change which was reflected in a new flag of Germany that in fact was older than the former one, dating back to early 19th century democratic movements. In the Paris Peace Conference, the outbreak of the war was blamed on Germany and other Central Powers allies. These nations, which by now had new governments, were banned from the 1920 Summer Olympics. While all other banned nations were invited again for the 1924 Summer Olympics, held for the second time in Pierre de Coubertin's home town of Paris, the ban on Germany was not lifted until 1925. This was likely related to French Occupation of the Ruhr and the Rheinland between 1923 and 1925.

After 16 years of absence, a new generation of German athletes returned in the 1928 Summer Olympics, scoring second overall. Four years later, the worldwide Great Depression prevented many athletes from competing in the 1932 Games in Los Angeles. Winning only three gold medals, the German team was ranked ninth, though it did finish tied in silver medals, with 12.

In the spring of 1931 the 1936 Summer Olympics were awarded to Berlin, 20 years later than originally planned. From 1933 onwards, the Nazi Party ruled Germany, a change being marked by the use of the Nazi flag. In the games, the 348 German athletes not only outnumbered the 310 Americans, but outscored them for the first time in the medal count in which Germany ranked first. Also, German gymnasts Konrad Frey and Alfred Schwarzmann won the most medals, with six and five in total, of which three each were gold, while American Jesse Owens had won four gold medals himself. Leni Riefenstahl documented the games in the film Olympia.

The 1940 Summer Olympics as well as the 1944 Summer Olympics were canceled due to World War II. For the 1948 Summer Olympics, with the war a recent memory, Germany and Japan were not invited.

Separate German teams 1952–1988 

A United Team of Germany with athletes from two states appeared three times at the Olympic games from 1956 to 1964. The IOC currently does not attribute these results to Germany (GER), but lists them separately as the Equipe Unifiée Allemande (EUA).

In the 1952 Games, only athletes from West Germany and the Saar Protectorate took part. The former represented the Federal Republic of Germany (GER), which as the only independent democratic state, covering the largest part of Germany, claimed exclusive mandate to represent the entire country. Athletes from the Saar Protectorate (SAA) competed as a separate team, as the French-occupied region would not join the Federal Republic of Germany until 1955.

West Germany used the code GER at the Games from 1968 to 1976, although its athletes' participation is now coded as FRG by the IOC, a code introduced in 1980.

Athletes from the Soviet-occupied German Democratic Republic (GDR) appeared in a separate team after the United Team effort was discontinued. In five Games, from 1968 to 1980 and again in 1988, they represented the GDR before the East German states joined the Federal Republic of Germany in 1990, and the GDR ceased to exist.

Since 1990, the enlarged Federal Republic of Germany has been simply called Germany (GER). West Germany's six Olympic teams (from 1952, 1968, 1972, 1976, 1984 and 1988) are still listed by the IOC under FRG, though, and not attributed to GER.

In the 1980s, each of the two states participated in one of the multinational boycotts of Summer Games. Many Western countries, including the Federal Republic of Germany, boycotted the Moscow Games of 1980 due to the Soviet invasion of Afghanistan the year before. In return, 14 Eastern Bloc states, including the GDR, boycotted the Los Angeles Games in 1984. Thus, only one German team was present in each of these two Olympics.

FRG (West Germany)
The Federal Republic of Germany (FRG), often called West Germany during the Cold War, was founded in 1949 as the largest of the three German states formed under occupation after the division of Germany following World War II. The West German NOC continued the tradition of the German NOC that had joined the IOC in 1895, and continued to represent the Germany that was enlarged after the Saar Protectorate (SAA) joined the Federal Republic of Germany in 1956, and after the states of the former German Democratic Republic (GDR) (East Germany) had joined in the process of German reunification in 1990.

German teams competed in the 1952 Summer Olympics under the designations of GER and SAA. In the Games of 1956, 1960 and 1964, German athletes competed as a United Team of Germany (EUA), but 1968 until the end of the Cold War, the two states sent independent teams designated as West and East Germany, until the separate East German state ceased to exist.

United Team of Germany 1956–1964

After three German states had been founded in Germany under occupation after World War II, athletes from the Federal Republic of Germany (FRG, West Germany) and the German Democratic Republic (GDR, East Germany) competed together as the United Team of Germany (EUA for) in the 1956, 1960, and 1964 Winter and Summer Olympics.

Prior to that, German athletes from West Germany and the French-occupied Saar Protectorate took part in the 1952 Summer Olympics organized in different teams designated as GER and SAA. The Saar Protectorate joined the Federal Republic after 1955, while the East German authorities, which had not taken part in the 1952 Games, agreed in 1956 to let their athletes compete in a united team that used the black-red-gold tricolour, but with additional Olympic rings in white placed upon the red middle stripe, as East German politicians were eager not to compete under the traditional German flag used both by West Germany and even themselves. Only in 1959, the GDR added socialist symbols to create a distinct Flag of East Germany. As the use of the Deutschlandlied, dating back to 1841 and 1797, of the recently created East German anthem, or of possible combinations was also rejected, Beethoven's melody to Schiller's Ode an die Freude (Ode to Joy) was played for winning German athletes as a compromise in lieu of a national anthem.

During the Games of 1956, 1960 and 1964 the traditional abbreviation GER for Germany was used, or rather the equivalents in the language of the host country. In Innsbruck in 1964, the Austrian officials used the international license plate code of D for Deutschland (Germany) for the country. The IOC code currently uses EUA (from the official French-language IOC designation, Equipe Unifiée Allemande) and applies this in hindsight for the United German Team. No reasoning is given, it may be done to allow for the political circumstances during the German divide between 1949 and 1990, and the involvement of two National Olympic Committees rather than only one.

Despite initially calling for a "united Germany" in the East German anthem, the socialist East German government intensified its separation in Germany, with the erection of the Berlin Wall in August 1961 obstructing travel within Germany even more. The travel of GDR athletes, such as to contests and training sites in the Alps, was limited due to fear of Republikflucht.

As a result of this development, in the 1968 Winter and Summer Olympics, German athletes competed as separate West and East teams, while still using the compromise flag and Beethoven anthem that year. The French organizers of the Grenoble Games used the codes ALL (Allemagne, Germany) and ADE (Allemagne de l'Est, East Germany), which roughly correspond to the IOC codes of GER and GDR.

The separation was completed at the 1972 Winter and Summer Olympics (the latter was hosted by West Germany), when the two countries used separate flags and anthems. This continued until the German Reunification of 1990 where the German Democratic Republic became part of the Federal Republic of Germany.

Overview of Olympic participation

All German NOCs at the Summer Olympics

Combined medals at the Summer Olympics (including all German NOCs) 
status after the 2020 Olympics

Medals by sport (GER 1896-1936, 1952, 1992-current )
These totals do not include the one gold and one silver medal won by Germany in figure skating at the 1908 Summer Olympics.

Medals by sport (EUA 1956-1964)
<div style="font-size:90%";>

Medals by sport (GDR 1968-1988)

Medals by sport (FRG 1968-1988)

Medalists

Archery

Athletics

Boxing

Beach volleyball

Canoeing

Cycling

Diving

Equestrian

Fencing

Field Hockey

Figure Skating

Football

Gymnastics

Handball

Judo

Modern pentathlon

Rowing

Rugby

Sailing

Shooting

Swimming

Men

Women

Table tennis

Taekwondo

Tennis

Triathlon

Water Polo

Weightlifting

Wrestling

Summary by sport

Aquatics

Swimming

Germany first competed in swimming at 1900 Games, with six swimmers in five events, winning two gold medals.

Athletics

Cycling

Germany competed in all six of the cycling events at the first Games in 1896, earning a silver medal.

Equestrian

Germany competed in equestrian at the first Games in which the sport was held, in Paris 1900. One rider competed in the mail coach event, winning no medals.

Fencing

Germany first competed in fencing in 1900, with a single sabreur who did not advance past the first round.

Gymnastics

Germany competed in all eight of the gymnastics events at the first Games in 1896, winning five of them and medaling in all eight.

Rowing

Germany was among the nations that competed at the first Olympic rowing regatta in 1900, with three boats in the men's coxed four (all of which earned medals in an unusual event that awarded two full sets of medals) and one in the men's eight.

Rugby

Germany competed in the inaugural Olympic rugby union contest in 1900, taking joint silver with Great Britain behind winners France. Germany did not compete in any of the other rugby union competitions (in 1908, 1920, or 1924) and was not among the nations competing in the rugby sevens in 2016.

Sailing

Germany competed in the first Olympic sailing competitions in 1900, taking a gold and a silver medal.

Tennis

Germany first competed in tennis at the inaugural 1896 Games, with one player competing in men's singles and, as part of a mixed team, in men's doubles. Friedrich Traun lost to John Boland in the first round of the singles, but paired with him to win the gold in the doubles. The mixed team medal is not credit to Germany.

Weightlifting

Germany first competed in weightlifting at the inaugural 1896 Games, with one lifter competing in one event.

Wrestling

Germany first competed in wrestling at the inaugural 1896 Games, with one wrestler (actually a gymnast, Carl Schuhmann) competing in the open weight class event. He won the gold medal.

References

External links
 
  Chronology of Germany at the Olympics